Petru Fudduni (c. 1600 in Palermo, Sicily – March 22, 1670) was a poet who wrote predominantly in Sicilian.  He was born Pietro Fullone but was generally known by his Sicilian name.  He was Sicily's greatest and most famed writer of the 17th century.  He represents a literary link between the Sicilian writers Antonio Veneziano, who wrote in the 16th century, and Giovanni Meli and Domenico Tempio, who wrote in the late 18th and early 19th centuries.

The themes of his poetry, if not outright religious in nature, often deal with the mysteries of life and the universe.  Yet, like the works of Meli and Nino Martoglio, he was able to tackle such subjects with a great deal of humour and wit.

Example of his poetry
The following sample of poetry illustrates a favourite technique of Fudduni, where he, as a protagonist in the poem, responds to a philosophical question.

External links
 Short biography and sample of poetry, translation by Arthur V. Dieli

References
 Arba Sicula, Vol. 2, 1980 (source of sample poem and English translation).

Sicilian-language poets
1600s births
1670 deaths
Writers from Palermo
Year of birth uncertain